Akiko Nishina (仁科亜希子) (born 3 April 1953 in Tokyo, Japan) is a Japanese actress. Once 仁科明子, her name is now 仁科亜季子, after divorcing from Hiroki Matsukata, a famous actor in Japan.

Film
Itsuka dokusho suruhi (2005)

Television
Katsu Kaishū (1974)
Daitokai Series (Part1 and 2)

External links

1953 births
Living people
Japanese actresses
People from Tokyo